Albert Philippe Taillandier (8 February 1879 – ?) was a French racing cyclist who competed in the late 19th century and early 20th century. He participated in cycling at the 1900 Summer Olympics in Paris and won the gold medal in the men's sprint.

References

External links
 

French male cyclists
Olympic gold medalists for France
Olympic cyclists of France
Cyclists at the 1900 Summer Olympics
1879 births
Year of death missing
Place of birth missing
Olympic medalists in cycling
Medalists at the 1900 Summer Olympics
French track cyclists